Jacques Visschers (6 December 1940 – 21 August 2020) was a Dutch footballer who played as a forward. He spent his entire football career at NAC Breda, from 1948 until 1971, when he retired from football. After his football career, Visschers was NAC Breda's team manager, one of the founders and a board member of the VVCS and a board member of the S.C.F. Jacques Visschers was a member of the KNVB’s arbitration committee and was a member of NAC Breda’s supervisory board. Visschers also was a member of the Order of Orange-Nassau and a member of honour of NAC Breda.

Club career

Early years
Born in Amsterdam in 1940, Jacques Visschers only lived shortly in the Dutch capital. His father was originally from Breda and was temporarily transferred there for his work. At the age of 7 Visschers wanted to play for NAC Breda, but because he was Catholic, his neighbourhood supported Breda’s V.V. Baronie and he was too young, he did not join NAC Breda. When he turned 9 years old, he played his first youth match for NAC Breda. During his younger career he played as an attacking midfielder. Cor Kools advised him at the age of 18 to become a striker.

Senior career
On 6 March 1960 Visschers made his debut for NAC Breda in the away match against Sittardia. In 1961 he became a semi professional football player, in which he earned 1500 guilders a year. In 1965 NAC was relegated to the Eerste Divisie, an event which Visschers held himself responsible for. “I always say it’s my fault. Normally I scored 10 to 15 goals a season. That season I only scored two goals”. At that time Visschers also thought about retirement. In his opinion football became too harsh and the technical players became the victim. On 6 June 1971 Visschers played his last match for NAC against MVV. After 282 matches, in which he scored 129 goals, he retired from professional football.

Post-playing career
After his football career Visschers worked in several roles in the financial sector. He ended up as a financial director for Nimox. Besides his work, he was still actively involved in football. From 1967 until 1977 he was a board member of the VVCS, the Dutch Association for Professional Football players. In 1978 Visschers was asked to join the KNVB’s arbitrary commission and later he joined the KNVB's financial commission. After his professional football career, Visschers was NAC's team manager.

From the nineties onwards, Visschers postponed his voluntary activities and supported NAC Breda from the stands. In 2003 Visschers joined NAC's supervisory board, after the club was saved from near bankruptcy. From 2003 onwards, he was responsible for football affairs and scouting.

Despite earlier denials towards fans and stakeholders by management and the Board members, it appeared at the end of season 2009–2010 that NAC's financial position was not stable. The club lost €3.2 million that season, due to rebuilding the stadium and buying too expensive players. Board members Visschers, Willem van der Hoeven, and Bas Koomans resigned and Bas van Bavel became new chairman.

Honours
For his services to Dutch football, Visschers received the KNVB distinction De Nederlandse Leeuw (English: Dutch Lion). NAC's chairman Willem van der Hoeve granted Visschers NAC Breda's Member of Honour title for his services for the club. On 24 August 2008 Visschers was crowned as a member of the Order of Orange-Nassau. He received his membership for his great contributions to football in Breda and his special contributions to the Dutch football.

References

External links
 

1940 births
2020 deaths
Footballers from Breda
Association football forwards
Dutch footballers
NAC Breda players
Eredivisie players
Recipients of the Order of Orange-Nassau